Finsbury Estate is a large-scale housing estate in the Finsbury area of London, England,  comprising four purpose-built blocks of flats located on a level site, providing 451 residences. Patrick Coman House and Michael Cliffe House are high-rise blocks of 9 and 25 storeys respectively, while Joseph Trotter House and Charles Townsend House are of four storeys. Amenities include a community centre and library, below-ground car parking, a ball-games area and a playground area.  Islington Council received lottery-money funding to develop a new Islington Museum which opened beneath the library on the estate in 2008. A former museum at the Islington Town Hall closed on 15 December 2006.

Architecture
Finsbury Estate is a 'mixed development' of the High Modern period. It was designed by Emberton, Franck & Tardrew in 1965 for Finsbury Borough Council, though completed after Finsbury had been absorbed into the new Metropolitan Borough of Islington. Franck had worked for Tecton, and there are similarities with the architecture of Tecton estates such as Spa Green Estate, as pointed out by the Survey of London. Through the configuration of the four blocks, two large open spaces have been created, characterized by two predominant inward-looking convex spaces defined by the surrounding blocks of flats. Main entrances to the estate are on St John Street, where the Finsbury Library is located, and on Skinner Street to the south-west.

Accommodation

 Patrick Coman House: 9 storeys, comprising 143 flats, 48 3-bedroom, 80 2-bedroom, 15 bed-sitting.
 Charles Townsend House: 4 storeys to the south of the estate, comprising 52 flats: 6 4-bedroom, 6 2-bedroom, 24 one-bedroom and 16 bed-sitting.
 Michael Cliffe House: 25-storey tower block, 185 flats, 31 3-bedroom, 78 2-bedroom, 76  1-bedroom.
 Joseph Trotter Close: 4 storeys comprising 15 ground-floor maisonettes for large families, with their own front gardens and private gardens at rear.  71 flats: 27 4-bedroom, 13 3-bedroom, 9 2-bedroom, 1 1-bedroom and 21 bed-sitting.

Controversies
Michael Cliffe House was a venue for suicide by jumping until access to high open balconies was restricted.

Cultural associations
 Michael Cliffe House is named after a former mayor of Finsbury Borough Council.
 Joseph Trotter House is also named after a former Mayor of Finsbury; his son, also named Joseph Trotter, later served as Mayor of Islington.
 Channel 4's award-winning British sitcom Peep Show, series 1 episode 5 was filmed at Super Hans's fictional flat at Michael Cliffe House on the Finsbury estate.

Nearby London Underground stations
 Angel (Northern line)
 Farringdon (Circle line, Hammersmith & City line, Metropolitan line, - First Capital Connect)
 Barbican (Circle line, Hammersmith & City line, Metropolitan line)

References

Brutalist architecture in London
Housing estates in the London Borough of Islington
Residential buildings completed in 1968